Contraband refers to goods which are illegal to possess or trade.

Contraband may also refer to:

Arts, entertainment, and media

Films
 Contraband (1925 film), a lost silent film
 Contraband (1940 film), a Powell and Pressburger film
 Contraband (1980 film), an Italian crime drama directed by Lucio Fulci
 Contraband (2012 film), an American film

Music
 Contraband (band), a short-lived supergroup formed in the early 1990s
 Contraband (big band), a progressive big band led by trombonist Willem van Manen
 Contraband, an Australian hard rock band previously known as Finch
 Contraband (Golden Earring album), a 1976 release from the Dutch rock band
 Contraband (Madcon album), released in 2010 by the Norwegian urban music duo Madcon
 Contraband (Velvet Revolver album), the 2004 debut album from US rock band Velvet Revolver
 Contraband, debut album for Spliff Star, released in 2008
 "Contraband", a track from Mad Caddies' 2003 album Just One More

Literature  
 Contraband (novel), (1938) novel by cuban writer and journalist Enrique Serpa

Other uses
 Contraband (American Civil War), a status for fugitive slaves behind Union lines in Confederate territory during the American Civil War
 Contraband (coal mine), items which for safety reasons are not allowed to be taken underground in a coal mine
 Contraband (performance group), a dance-based performance ensemble from San Francisco
 Contraband Bayou, a large bayou in Louisiana, United States